This is a list of German football transfers in the winter 2010–11 transfer window by club.

Bundesliga

FC Bayern Munich

In:

Out:

Note: Flags indicate national team as has been defined under FIFA eligibility rules. Players may hold more than one non-FIFA nationality.

FC Schalke 04

In:

 

Out:

Werder Bremen

In:

Out:

Bayer 04 Leverkusen

In:

Out:

Borussia Dortmund

In:

Out:

VfB Stuttgart

In:

Out:

Hamburger SV

In:

Out:

VfL Wolfsburg

In:

Out:

1. FSV Mainz

In:

Out:

Eintracht Frankfurt

In:

Out:

1899 Hoffenheim

In:

Out:

Borussia Mönchengladbach

In:

Out:

1. FC Köln

In:

Out:

SC Freiburg

In:

Out:

Hannover 96

In:

Out:

1. FC Nürnberg

In:

Out:

1. FC Kaiserslautern

In:

Out:

FC St. Pauli

In:

Out:

2. Bundesliga

VfL Bochum

In:

Out:

Hertha BSC

In:

Out:

FC Augsburg

In:

Out:

Fortuna Düsseldorf

In:

Out:

SC Paderborn

In:

Out:

MSV Duisburg

In:

Out:

Arminia Bielefeld

In:

Out:

TSV 1860 Munich

In:

Out:

Karlsruher SC

In:

Out:

FC Energie Cottbus

In:

Out:

SpVgg Greuther Fürth

In:

Out:

1. FC Union Berlin

In:

Out:

Alemannia Aachen

In:

Out:

Rot-Weiß Oberhausen

In:

Out:

FSV Frankfurt

In:

Out:

VfL Osnabrück

In:

Out:

FC Erzgebirge Aue

In:

Out:

FC Ingolstadt 04

In:

Out:

See also
 2010–11 Bundesliga
 2010–11 2. Bundesliga
 List of German football transfers summer 2010

References

External links
 Official site of the DFB 
 Kicker.de 
 Official site of the Bundesliga 
 Official site of the Bundesliga 

German
Trans
2010-11